Ahmed Mohamed Mohamud (known as Hurre, born in Garowe, in central Somalia, in 1957 - died August 17, 2002) was elected as sultan by his sub-clan of Omar Mohamud sub-clan of Majeerteen in 2000.

In 2002, Puntland, the region where Sultan Hurre belonged, experienced a political crisis when regional president Colonel Abdullahi Yusuf Ahmed’s three-year period was expiring. President Abdullahi refused to call for an election and instead planned to unconstitutionally extend his time in office. He accused Jama Ali Jama of having close ties with the Transitional National Government and local Islamist militants  Al-Itihaad Al-Islamiya.  The some traditional leaders, including Sultan Hurre, rejected President Abdullahi Yusuf's extension and instead called for a conference which elected Jama Ali Jama as president.

On the 17 August 2002, Sultan Hurre was brutally  killed by personal bodyguards of Colonel Abdullahi Yusuf Ahmed, President of Puntland. Col Abdullahi denied any involvement.

References

1957 births
2002 deaths
Ethnic Somali people
People from Garowe